Jérôme Dorival (born in 1952) is a French clarinetist, composer and musicologist.

Biography 
Born in Paris, Jérôme Dorival is one of the four sons of historian and art critic, Bernard Dorival. He studied at the Conservatoire de Paris with Norbert Dufourcq and Rémy Stricker, and at the Sorbonne with Albert Soboul, Pierre Vilar, Dominique Julia and Alphonse Dupront. His doctoral thesis in musicology deals with La Cantatille en France au XVIII, under the direction of Jacques Chailley.

As a researcher, he devoted himself especially to the pianist and pedagogue Hélène de Montgeroult, professor at the brand new Conservatoire in 1795 and composer. For the reissue of the scores of Montgeroult, Dorival founded the Éditions Modulation.

He is professor of music history at the Conservatoire de Lyon and in Lausanne.

As a composer, he has been a member of the  since 1985.

Work

Compositions 
 1993: Le son des choses dans les ténèbres, hommage to Georges Perec
 2001: La cathédrale, nocturne for piano, hommage to Nicolas de Staël.

Musicological writings
 
 Le Concerto pour clavier : approches multiples, partition, histoire, art, with Dominique Dubreuil and Daniel Gaudet, Aléas, 2001 .
 (dir.) Les concerts à Lyon au 17e siècle, Musée Gadagne, Musée historique de Lyon, 2004 
 

 Articles
 (preface) Musique et notations,  Aléas, series "Collection Musique et Sciences", 1999 
 « Le Plein du vide by Xu Yi, étude esthétique et analytique », in Tempus perfectum No 1 (August 2011), Symétrie, 24 pages , 
 « Paule de Lestang, chanteuse, pianiste et claveciniste : une musicienne aux multiples talents », in Tempus perfectum No 7, Symétrie, 27 pages , 
 « À propos du cas Montgeroult : réflexions sur la constitution et l’écriture des « grands récits » musicologiques », in Aline Tauzin, Musique, Femmes et Interdits, Symétrie, (pp. 119–146).

Discography 
 Doubles 3 composed with James Giroudon, in Musiques pour cordes - Ensemble instrumental, dir. Éric Sprogis (1992, Forlane UCD16664) 
 Le son des choses dans les ténèbres , in À voix basse - ensemble Grame (1995, Grame GR005)

References

External links 
 
 Jérôme Dorival, La Marquise et la Marseillaise on musicology.org
 Jérôme Dorival: Hélène de Montgeroult – La Marquise et la Marseillaise on Anaclase

1952 births
Musicians from Paris
Living people
20th-century French musicologists
21st-century French musicologists
Conservatoire de Paris alumni
Academic staff of the Conservatoire de Paris
French classical composers
French male classical composers